The Best Times is an American drama series that aired on NBC in 1985.

Summary
The show was about single mother/widow Joanne Braithwaite returning to teach English at Southern California's John F. Kennedy High School. Joanne's daughter, Mia just started at JFK High School, trying hard to fit in. Joanne found support in science teacher Mr. Dan Bragen. The students of JFK High were jock Tony, tough girl Annette, former high school dropout Chris, Dionne & Giselle, who were part-time workers at a fast-food restaurant called The Potato Palace, Neil "Trout" Troutman, who was the Potato Palace's night manager, Trout's girlfriend, Joy, and Trout's younger, troublemaker brother, Dale. The show focused on problems such as drugs and premarital sex.

Cancellation
The show only lasted a season, ending on June 24, 1985, and was revised from an earlier 1984 pilot called Things Are Looking Up.

Cast
Janet Eilber as Ms. Joanne Braithwaite
Beth Ehlers as Mia Braithwaite
Jim Metzler as Mr. Dan Bragen
Jay Baker as Tony Younger
Liane Alexandra Curtis as Annette Dimetriano
Darren Dalton as Chris Henson
LaSaundra Hall as Dionne McAllister
Tammy Lauren as Giselle Kraft
David Packer as Neil "Trout" Troutman
K.C. Martel as Dale Troutman
Melora Hardin as Joy Villafranco

Episodes

External links

1980s American high school television series
1980s American workplace drama television series
1985 American television series debuts
1985 American television series endings
NBC original programming
English-language television shows
Television series about educators
Television series by Lorimar Television
Television shows set in California
Television series by Lorimar-Telepictures